Blevio is a comune (municipality) in the Province of Como in the Italian region Lombardy, located about  north of Milan and about  northeast of Como.

Blevio borders the following municipalities: Brunate, Cernobbio, Como, Moltrasio, Torno.

History 

The comune of Blevio includes seven  villages, the so-called "the seven cities" (Capovico, Cazzanore, Girola, Maggianico, Mezzovico, Sopravilla, Sorto), the most important of which was Capovico, the closest one to Lake Como.

The etymology of the name of the city could be found in the Celtic Ligurian "Biuelius" (Latin "vivo – alive", Welsh "byw", old Irish "biu – I use to be" and Anglo-Saxon "beo – I am, I become", Indo-Germanic "bheou").

In 1497 the ruler of Milan Ludovico Sforza gave the fief of Blevio, together with some other near villages, to his lover Ludovica Crivelli. In the following centuries, Blevio became closely linked to Como and finally became a fief of the Tanzi patrician family, whose wealth was based on the silk industry. Count Antonio von Tanzi Blevio, who had been ennobled by the Habsburgs due to his banking activity, built a large villa on the rocks of Perlasca, now part of the neighbouring town of Torno. In 1798, the villa and the village became a possession of the Taverna and Borromeo families, two of the most affluent families of the Milanese aristocracy, before being created as a free town after the Napoleonic invasion of Italy. A minor branch of the same family, who received the title of Edler von Tanzi by the Habsburgs, continued to keep vast possessions of lands in Blevio and nearby Torno until early 1900.
Blevio joined the Kingdom of Sardinia in 1859 and later the Kingdom of Italy in 1861, following the conquest of the Piedmontese army of Lombardy. Its numerous lakefront villas host a number of Italian and international celebrities, including singers, actors and athletes.

References

External links 
 https://web.archive.org/web/20070821062928/http://www.blevioinlinea-glv.it/index.htm -
 http://maps.google.it/maps?oi=eu_map&q=Blevio&hl=it -
 https://web.archive.org/web/20071217045759/http://www.passolento.it/erratici.htm – 
 https://web.archive.org/web/20070716051017/http://www.archeologicacomo.org/main.html?cat=4&scheda=47%23

Cities and towns in Lombardy